Daniel Ochefu (born December 15, 1993) is an American-born Nigerian professional basketball player for Al Riyadi Club Beirut of the Lebanese Basketball League (LBL). He played college basketball for the Villanova Wildcats, and had a short stint in the NBA with the Washington Wizards.

High school career
Born in Baltimore, Maryland, Ochefu attended the Westtown School, where he averaged 16 points and 12 rebounds per game as a junior. As a senior, he transferred to Downingtown East High School. He was ranked 54th on ESNPU's list of the top 100 players in his high school class.

College career
Ochefu played college basketball for Villanova. As a freshman, he played behind center Mouphtaou Yarou. In 2013–14, he averaged 5.7 points per game as a reserve player. The following season, he had 9.2 points per game.

Ochefu scored a career-high 25 points in a 73–63 win over St. John's on February 13, 2016. At the conclusion of the regular season, he was named Honorable Mention All-Big East. Ochefu played in the NCAA championship game on April 4, 2016 against North Carolina, where he helped the Wildcats defeat the Tar Heels 77–74, and claim Villanova's second national championship.

Professional career

Washington Wizards (2016–2017)
After going undrafted in the 2016 NBA draft, Ochefu joined the Washington Wizards for the Las Vegas Summer League, where he averaged 1.8 points and 2.8 rebounds per game. On September 23, 2016, he signed with the Wizards. He made his debut for the Wizards in their season opener on October 27, recording one rebound in four minutes off the bench in a 114–99 loss to the Atlanta Hawks.

Maine Red Claws (2017)
On October 9, 2017, Ochefu was waived by the Wizards. The Boston Celtics signed him on October 13, 2017. He was assigned to G-League affiliate team the Maine Red Claws.

Windy City Bulls (2017–2018) 
On November 30, 2017, Ochefu was acquired by the Windy City Bulls.

Reno Bighorns / Stockton Kings (2018–2019)
On February 12, 2018, Ochefu was traded by the Bulls to the Reno Bighorns along with a 2018 third-round draft pick and the returning player rights to Spencer Dinwiddie in exchange for Will Davis, the returning player rights to Lamar Patterson, and a 2018 first-round draft pick. He remained on the team as it became the Stockton Kings. Ochefu averaged 14 points and 8 rebounds per game.

Overseas (2019–present)
On April 2, 2019, Cafés Candelas Breogán of the Liga ACB announced the signing of Ochefu.

In July 2019, Ochefu signed with the Ibaraki Robots in Japan.

In August 2022, he signed with the Rain or Shine Elasto Painters of the Philippine Basketball Association (PBA) as the team's import for the 2022–23 PBA Commissioner's Cup. However, he was replaced by Steve Taylor prior to the start of the tournament.

In February 2023, Ochefu signed with the TNT Tropang Giga as the team's import for the 2023 EASL Champions Week held in Japan.

International career
He was called up for the Nigeria national basketball team for the 2017 FIBA Africa Championship.

NBA career statistics

Regular season

|-
| align="left" | 
| align="left" | Washington
| 19 || 0 || 3.9 || .444 || .000 || .000 || 1.2 || .2 || .1 || .0 || 1.3
|-
| align="center" colspan="2" | Career
| 19 || 0 || 3.9 || .444 || .000 || .000 || 1.2 || .2 || .1 || .0 || 1.3

Playoffs

|-
| style="text-align:left;"| 2017
| style="text-align:left;"| Washington
| 4 || 0 || 1.3 || .000 || .000 || .000 || .3 || .0 || .0 || .0 || .0
|- class="sortbottom"
| align="center" colspan="2"|Career
| 4 || 0 || 1.3 || .000 || .000 || .000 || .3 || .0 || .0 || .0 || .0

References

External links
ESPN bio

1993 births
Living people
21st-century African-American sportspeople
African-American basketball players
American expatriate basketball people in Mexico
American expatriate basketball people in Japan
American expatriate basketball people in South Korea
American expatriate basketball people in Spain
American men's basketball players
American sportspeople of Nigerian descent
Basketball players from Baltimore
Basketball players from Pennsylvania
CB Breogán players
Citizens of Nigeria through descent
Ibaraki Robots players
Libertadores de Querétaro players
Liga ACB players
Maine Red Claws players
Nigerian expatriate basketball people in Japan
Nigerian expatriate basketball people in Mexico
Nigerian expatriate basketball people in Spain
Nigerian expatriate sportspeople in South Korea
Nigerian men's basketball players
Power forwards (basketball)
Reno Bighorns players
Seoul Samsung Thunders players
Stockton Kings players
Undrafted National Basketball Association players
Villanova Wildcats men's basketball players
Washington Wizards players
Windy City Bulls players
Westtown School alumni
TNT Tropang Giga players
American expatriate basketball people in the Philippines